Zaluzhany (before 1946 – Tatary) is a village (selo) in Sambir Raion, Lviv Oblast, in Western Ukraine. It belongs to Novyi Kalyniv urban hromada, one of the hromadas of Ukraine. As of 2001, it has a population of 386.

Climate

History 
In the village the settlement of the Copper Age was studied.

Demographics 

According to the 2001 census, the entire population of villages was Ukrainian-speaking (100%).

Bibliography

References 

Zaluzhany
10th century in Ukraine
Populated places established in the 10th century